The outcome (in %) of the Turkish local elections before 1980  (1963-1977) is shown below. (In 1981 all parties were closed by the military rule. For the local elections after 1980, see Turkish local elections after 1980.) In the local elections in addition to mayors and muhtars, members of local parliaments are elected. The voter base of the local parliaments and the national parliament is assumed to be identical. In the table, only those parties which received more than 1% are shown.

Legent of the abbreviations 
AP:Justice Party
CHP:Republican People's Party
YTP:New Turkey Party
CKMP: Republican Peasants' Nation Party
Later MHP: National Movement Party
MP:Nation Party (issued from CKMP)
GP: Confidence Party (issued from CHP)
Later CGP:Republican Confidence Party
TİP:Turkish Workers' Party
BP: Unity Party
Later TBP:Turkey Unity Party
DP:Democratic Party (issued from AP)
MSP: National Salvation Party

References 

1979
Political history of Turkey
Local, 1980-